Nights and Weekends is a 2008 American mumblecore film co-directed, co-written, co-produced by and co-starring Joe Swanberg and Greta Gerwig. The film follows a long-distance relationship and its aftermath.

It premiered at South by Southwest, screened within such festivals as Maryland Film Festival, and was released theatrically in the United States on October 10, 2008.

Plot 
The film recounts a long-distance relationship between two people, one of whom lives in Chicago, the other in New York City. The first half of the film follows their relationship while the second half focuses on the dissolution and potential continuation of it, which occurs a year after the events of the first half of the film.

Cast 
 Alison Bagnall as Reporter
 Elizabeth Donius as James' brother's wife
 Jay Duplass as James' brother
 Greta Gerwig as Mattie
 Kent Osborne as Mattie's sister's boyfriend
 Lynn Shelton as Mattie's sister
 Ellen Stagg as Photographer
 Joe Swanberg as James
 Jesse Cilio as the Neighbor

Production 
The second half of the film was shot a year after the first half, mirroring the timeline of the story.

Release

Critical reception 
On review aggregator website Rotten Tomatoes, the film has an approval rating of 89% based on 19 reviews, with an average rating of 6.8/10. On Metacritic, which assigns a normalized rating to reviews, the film has a weighted average score of 59 out of 100, based on 6 critics, indicating "mixed or average reviews".

Accolades 
Nights and Weekends producer Dia Sokol Savage was nominated for the Piaget Producers Award at the 25th Independent Spirit Awards.

References

External links 
 
 
 

American independent films
2008 films
2008 independent films
Films directed by Joe Swanberg
Films directed by Greta Gerwig
Films with screenplays by Greta Gerwig
Mumblecore films
2000s English-language films
2000s American films